The 1880 Amherst football team represented Amherst College during the 1880 college football season.

Schedule

References

Amherst
Amherst Mammoths football seasons
College football winless seasons
Amherst football